Bindhyawasini is a village in Achham District in the Seti Zone of western Nepal. According to the 1991 Nepal census, the village had a population of 2402 living in 485 houses. At the time of the 2001 Nepal census, the population was 3041, of which 37% was literate.

References

Populated places in Achham District
Village development committees in Achham District